The Kyiv Bridge or the Road bridge across the Desna is a currently destroyed brick-and-stone bridge over the Desna River in Chernihiv, Ukraine, located along Peace (Myru) Avenue.

History
The bridge was built in 1859 as part of the construction of the Odesa-Kyiv-Chernihiv-St. Petersburg highway. Prior to that, the left bank of the Desna was crossed by ferry, which was located at a dump one verst upstream from the location of the bridge. During large floods, part of the highway would flood and traffic would temporarily stop. In 1877, a section of the bridge was even demolished by water, and was subsequently reconstructed in the late 19th - early 20th centuries. In 1893, a station on the Chernihiv-Kruty narrow-gauge railway was built on the left bank near the bridge. In January 1919, there was a battle between the kurins of the Directorate of the Ukrainian People's Republic and of the Bohunsky Regiment of the Ukrainian Soviet Army near the bridge. After World War II, the bridge did not meet the needs of vehicles, so in 1956 a new bridge was put into operation a little lower downstream from the previous one, and the old one was dismantled. Over time, its bandwidth was also insufficient, thus in 1986 a new bridge over the Desna near the village of Shestovytsya in Chernihiv Raion was put into operation, which was designated to be used by transit vehicles.

On the night of March 22-23, 2022, the bridge was destroyed during the second Russian invasion of Ukraine during the Siege of Chernihiv - as a result of an air strike (according to other sources - by order of the local mayor and Vyacheslav Chaus, the Head of the Chernihiv Regional Military Administration). Recently, the bridge had been used to evacuate citizens and deliver humanitarian goods.

General data
The total length of the bridge was 875 m, width - 7 m. The height of the bottom of the truss above the water level - 18 m. Load capacity - 80 t. The bridge consisted of a two-lane road and pedestrian paths on both sides.

Gallery

References

External links
 Format.cn.ua

1859 establishments in the Russian Empire
2022 disestablishments in Ukraine
Former road bridges in Ukraine
Demolished bridges in Ukraine
Bridges in Chernihiv
Buildings and structures destroyed during the 2022 Russian invasion of Ukraine